The 2022 World Team Table Tennis Championships were held in Chengdu, China from 30 September to 9 October 2022. The World Team Championships were originally scheduled in April and pushed back to September due to the COVID-19 pandemic.

Format
The teams were drawn in groups of five teams in principle. After a round robin in each group, the top two teams in groups and the highest-ranked (world team ranking) third-placed teams qualified for a 16-team knockout stage. Two losing semi-finalists received bronze medals in the absence of a third-place match.

Team match system
A team consisted of three members playing best of five singles. Each singles match was a best of five games. The order of play was:
A vs X
B vs Y
C vs Z
A vs Y
B vs X

Tie-breaking criteria for group play
A finished team match brought two points for a win, one point for a loss. No points were given for a loss in an unplayed or unfinished match. The ranking of teams in the group stage were determined as follows:
 Points obtained in all group matches;
 Points obtained in the matches played between the teams in question;
 Ratios of wins to losses in the singles matches played between the teams in question;
 Ratios of wins to losses in the games played between the teams in question;
 Ratios of wins to losses in the points played between the teams in question;
 Drawing of lots.

Qualification
Qualified teams were announced in June 2022. Number of teams eligible to compete for the trophy in each team event is expanded to 40, compared to the previous 24 teams in 2018. However, only 32 men's teams and 28 women's teams arrived in Chengdu with differences from the original list.

Schedule
The draw took place on 28 September. Group phase commences on 30 September and knockout stage starts on 5 October, with the women's and men's finals taking place on 8 and 9 October respectively.

Medal summary

Medal table

Medalists

References

External links
ITTF website
WotldTableTennis website

 
World Table Tennis Championships
Table tennis competitions in China
World Team Table Tennis Championships
World Team Table Tennis Championships
World Team Table Tennis Championships
World Team Table Tennis Championships